Charles Kenneth Heiden  (July 7, 1925 - August 7, 2020) was a major general in the United States Army, who served as the Commanding General of Fort Dix from 1980 to 1981. He graduated from the United States Military Academy in 1949.

References

2020 deaths
1925 births
United States Army generals